Daubach may refer to the following places in Rhineland-Palatinate, Germany.

 Daubach, Hunsrück
 Daubach, Westerwaldkreis